Andre Agassi defeated Jan-Michael Gambill in the final, 7–6(7–4), 6–1, 6–0 to win the men's singles tennis title at the 2001 Miami Open. With the win, he completed the Sunshine Double.

Pete Sampras was the defending champion, but lost in the third round to wildcard Andy Roddick.

Seeds
All thirty-two seeds received a bye to the second round.

Draw

Finals

Top half

Section 1

Section 2

Section 3

Section 4

Bottom half

Section 5

Section 6

Section 7

Section 8

External links
 Main draw

2001 Ericsson Open
Ericsson Open - Men's Singles